The South Main Street Residential Historic District encompasses a residential area south of downtown Little Rock, Arkansas.  The area, extending along South Main Street roughly between 19th and 23rd Streets, was developed between about 1880 and 1945, and includes a well-preserved set of residential architecture from that period.  Notable buildings include the Luxor Apartments, the Holcomb Court Apartments, and the Ada Thompson Memorial Home.

The district was listed on the National Register of Historic Places in 2007.  In 2012 it was enlarged to include the west side of the 2000 block of Scott Street.

See also

South Main Street Commercial Historic District (Little Rock, Arkansas)
National Register of Historic Places listings in Little Rock, Arkansas

References

Art Deco architecture in Arkansas
Historic districts in Little Rock, Arkansas
Historic districts on the National Register of Historic Places in Arkansas
National Register of Historic Places in Little Rock, Arkansas